Bawbeese was a Potawatomi village in 1830 located in what is today Hillsdale County, Michigan, United States.  It was located on Baw Beese Lake

References

Sources
Helen Hornbeck Tanner. Atlas of Great Lakes Indian History. (Norman: University of Oklahoma Press, 1987) p. 134.

Potawatomi
Pre-statehood history of Michigan
Geography of Hillsdale County, Michigan